Tamarix senegalensis is a species of flowering plants of the Tamaricaceae family. It is a tree or twiggy shrub, that grows in saline soil, sandy desert and sea-shore.

Description
Tamarix senegalensis is a large shrub, reaching 2-5 metres height. It has many small leaves. In Cape Verde it is called tarrafe, and the related name tarrafal has been given to a number of localities.

Distribution and ecology

Tamarix senegalensis occurs on and near the coasts of northwestern Africa (Morocco, Mauritania, Senegal) and the Cape Verde islands.

References

Further reading

senegalensis
Flora of Cape Verde
Flora of Senegal
Plants described in 1828